Igavere is a village in Raasiku Parish, Harju County in northern Estonia.

Actor Hans Kaldoja (1942–2017) was born in Igavere.

References
 

Villages in Harju County